The Tony Manzanares House, near Los Ojos, New Mexico, was built in 1930.  It was listed on the National Register of Historic Places in 1985.

Its main section is built of hewn horizontal logs and mud plaster, with end notching of the logs;  a rear addition uses jacal.

References

		
National Register of Historic Places in Rio Arriba County, New Mexico
Houses completed in 1930
1930 establishments in New Mexico